Heinz Helmut Lorenz (26 November 1915 – 15 November 2013) was a Czechoslovak athlete who competed in the 1936 Summer Olympics in Berlin, Germany. He was born in Litoměřice. He competed with the Czech team in the Men's 4 x 400 meters relay, but did not advance beyond the preliminary round, his team placing fifth and last. He died in November 2013 at the age of 97 in Geretsried.

References

1915 births
2013 deaths
Athletes (track and field) at the 1936 Summer Olympics
Olympic athletes of Czechoslovakia
Czechoslovak male sprinters
Sudeten German people
People from Litoměřice
Sportspeople from the Ústí nad Labem Region